Spalletti is a surname. Notable people with the surname include:

Ettore Spalletti (1940-2019), Italian artist
Gabriella Rasponi Spalletti (1853-1931), Italian feminist, educator and philanthropist
Luciano Spalletti (born 1959), Italian footballer and football manager

Places
Palazzo Spalletti-Trivelli, in the center of Reggio Emilia, Emilia Romagna, Italy